TREE-PUZZLE is a computer program used to construct phylogenetic trees from sequence data by maximum likelihood analysis. Branch lengths can be calculated with and without the molecular clock hypothesis.

The program's successor is IQ-TREE.

See also
 Computational phylogenetics

References

External links
 

Phylogenetics software